Railway stations in Zambia include:

Maps
 UN Map

Principal towns served by rail

Existing

TAZARA

  Serenje
  Mkushi
  Chilanga
   - Tanzania / Zambian border
  Tunduma, Tanzania

Newly constructed
 (opened August 2011)
  Mchinji - connects to Malawi Railways
  Chipata - railhead, Dry port

Proposed rail
  Nacala - Indian Ocean deep-water port
   (border)   
   Mchinij 
   (border)
  Chipata - railhead from Mozambique and Malawi 
  Petauke 
  Serenje (proposed junction on Tazara line)

  Mpika - junction
  Kasama - junction
  Mpulungu - Lake Tanganyika port

Zambia - Angola
 (North-western rail project)
  Chingola
  Solwezi
  Kalumbila copper mine
   Jimbe border checkpoint 
  Luacano
  Benguela Railway (CFB) 
  Lobito port on Atlantic Ocean

Zambia - Namibia
Proposed in August 2013 
  Livingstone
  Caprivi Strip
  Grootfontein

Botswana - Zambia

 Botswana - Zambia - Kazungula bridge - 2010

Rehabilitation

 Kapiri Mposhi to Chingola in copperbelt; part of North-South Corridor Project

See also 

 History of rail transport in Zambia
 Rail transport in Zambia
 Zambia railways
 Railway stations in Angola

References

External links

 
Railway stations
Railway stations